Dagmara-Anna Handzlik (born 20 February 1986) is a Polish born Cypriot long distance runner. She competed in the women's marathon at the 2017 World Championships in Athletics. In 2019, she competed in the women's marathon at the 2019 World Athletics Championships held in Doha, Qatar. She did not finish her race.

College years
She started her studies at the University of Toledo in 2005. In 2005 she finished second place in the Mid-American Conference cross country championships behind her compatriot Beata Rudzińska from University of Akron. In summer of 2007 Handzlik transferred to University of Minnesota.

Personal best

References

External links

1986 births
Living people
Cypriot female long-distance runners
Cypriot female marathon runners
World Athletics Championships athletes for Cyprus
People from Bielsko
Cypriot people of Polish descent